Manish Patel (born June 17, 1983), known professionally as Manish Dayal, is an American actor. He is best known for his roles as Raj Kher in The CW hit teen series 90210 as well as in the films The Hundred Foot Journey (2014) and Viceroy's House (2017). Since 2018, he has featured as a main cast member of the Amy Holden Jones-created Fox medical drama series The Resident.

Early and personal life
Dayal was born Manish Patel to an Indian Gujarati family in Orangeburg, South Carolina. His parents, Hema and Sudhir Patel, are from Gujarat. He has three sisters , including Neisha Patel, who is a vascular neurology fellow at Columbia University Medical Center. He uses his grandfather's first name, Dayal, as his stage surname. He attended Marshall Elementary School and later went to Heathwood Hall in Columbia, South Carolina. He subsequently obtained a degree in International Business from George Washington University. After he graduated in 2005, he moved to New York to pursue his acting career, and five years later he moved to Los Angeles, where he resides with his wife and two children.

Career
Dayal started his career appearing in national commercials for McDonald's, Windows, Nintendo, and Domino's Pizza. In 2008, he played the lead in The New Group's twice-extended off-Broadway show Rafta, Rafta.... He played a small role in The Sorcerer's Apprentice and Paula van der Oest's Domino Effect. After guest-starring on CSI: Las Vegas on CBS, Dayal went on to play Hal, a code-breaking computer analyst, on the AMC series Rubicon. Dayal also starred in the romantic comedy Walkaway, which explores love and culture set in New York. In 2010 and 2011, he played Ravi, the smug A-team leader on Outsourced, a comedy series from NBC. He also played Raj Kher, an alternative college student recovering from cancer, in the third and fourth seasons of The CW's 90210. 

He starred as Hassan Kadam in The Hundred Foot Journey (2014). Since 2018, he has starred in the Fox TV series The Resident.

Filmography

Film

Television

Video games

References

External links

 

Living people
American male film actors
American male television actors
American male voice actors
Male actors from South Carolina
People from Orangeburg, South Carolina
George Washington University alumni
1983 births
George Washington University School of Business alumni
American male actors of Indian descent
Gujarati people